The forest white-eye or Cameroon green white-eye (Zosterops stenocricotus) is a species of bird in the family Zosteropidae. It is found from southeastern Nigeria to southwestern Central African Republic and northern Gabon.

Its natural habitats are subtropical, tropical moist montane forests, and subtropical or tropical high-altitude shrubland. It is threatened by habitat loss.

References

forest white eye
Birds of Central Africa
forest white-eye
forest white-eye